The Mongko Region Defence Army (abbreviated MRDA) was an insurgent group based in Mongko, Shan State, Myanmar. The then-ruling military junta in Myanmar, the State Peace and Development Council (SPDC), allegedly encouraged the MRDA to cooperate with narcos on the China–Myanmar border.

History 
In August 1995, Mong Hsala announced his split with Yang Maoliang and the Myanmar National Democratic Alliance Army (MNDAA), and renamed a brigade under his command to the Mongko Region Defence Army (MRDA). Immediately afterwards, the group signed a ceasefire with the government of Myanmar.

In September 2000, deputy commander Li Nimen mutinied and ousted Mong Hsala from the group, with support from Kokang leader Peng Jiasheng, who had ousted Yang Maoliang from the MNDAA several years prior. After Li Nimen attempted to ambush government soldiers stationed around Mongko, the Tatmadaw launched Operation Black Dragon, capturing, disarming and executing Li Nimen and most of his men. The remaining members of the MRDA were forcibly enlisted into the Myanmar Army and the group was dissolved.

References 

Paramilitary organisations based in Myanmar
Rebel groups in Myanmar